This event was held on Saturday 31 January 2009 as part of the 2009 UCI Cyclo-cross World Championships in Hoogerheide, Netherlands.

Ranking

Notes

External links
 Union Cycliste Internationale

Men's junior race
UCI Cyclo-cross World Championships – Men's junior race
2009 in cyclo-cross